All Remains to People is a 1963 Soviet drama film directed by Georgy Natanson. Based on the namesake play by Samuil Alyoshin.

Plot 
Renowned scientist Dronov works in Novosibirsk on the creation of an advanced reaction engine. He has a heart disease and fears being unable to complete his job. Unfortunately, the prototype engine repeatedly fails to pass the test at a Moscow factory. Dronov abandons the rest of his work, including the leadership of the Institute which is entrusted to his disciple Morozov.

Cast 
 Nikolai Cherkasov as Fyodor Dronov, academician
Sophia Pilyavskaya as Natalia, his wife  
 Andrei Popov as father Seraphim
 Elina Bystritskaya as Ksenia Rumyantseva
Igor Ozerov as Alexey Vyazmin
 Igor Gorbachev  as Victor Morozov, director of the Institute
 Yefim Kopelyan as Filimonov
Galina Anisimova as Asya

Awards 
Prize for the best male role in the All-Union Film Festival (Nikolai Cherkasov) (1964)
Lenin Prize (Nikolai Cherkasov) (1964)

References

External links

  RussianCinema

1960s Russian-language films
Soviet black-and-white films
Soviet drama films
Russian drama films
Soviet films based on plays
1963 drama films
1963 films
Films about scientists
Russian black-and-white films